The Defamation Act 1952 (15 & 16 Geo 6 & 1 Eliz 2 c 66) is an Act of the Parliament of the United Kingdom.

This Act implemented recommendations contained in the Report of the Porter Committee. The recommendation made by the Committee in relation to the rule in Smith v Streatfield was not implemented.

Section 3 - Slander of title, etc
See Malicious falsehood#England and Wales and Verbal injury.

Section 5 - Justification
See English defamation law#Justification

This section was repealed by the Defamation Act 2013.

Section 15 - Legislative powers of Parliament of Northern Ireland
This section was repealed by Part I of Schedule 6 to the Northern Ireland Constitution Act 1973.

This section extended to Northern Ireland in addition to the other places to which this Act extended.

This section provided that no limitation on the powers of the Parliament of Northern Ireland imposed by the Government of Ireland Act 1920 precluded that Parliament from making laws for purposes similar to the purposes of this Act.

The Defamation Act (Northern Ireland) 1955 was made for purposes similar to the purposes of this Act.

Section 18
Section 18(1) provides that the Act came into force at the end of the period of one month that began on the date on which it was passed. The word "months" means calendar months. The day (that is to say, 30 October 1952) on which the Act was passed (that is to say, received royal assent) is included in the period of one month. This means that the Act came into force on 30 November 1952.

The words "(except section fifteen)" in section 18(2) were repealed by Part I of Schedule 6 to the Northern Ireland Constitution Act 1973. This was consequential on the repeal of section 15 by that Part.

Section 18(3) repealed sections 4 and 6 of the Law of Libel Amendment Act 1888. It was repealed by Part XI of the Schedule to the Statute Law (Repeals) Act 1974.

See also
Defamation Act
English defamation law

References
Halsbury's Statutes,

External links
The Defamation Act 1952, as amended from the National Archives.
The Defamation Act 1952, as originally enacted from the National Archives.

United Kingdom Acts of Parliament 1952
United Kingdom defamation law
English defamation law